The Punjab Legislative Council was the upper house of the state legislature of the Indian state of Punjab. This upper house of the Punjab legislature was disbanded by Punjab Legislative Council (Abolition) Act, 1969.

References

Politics of Punjab, India